Bosch Fawstin is an American cartoonist and anti-Islam activist. He was born into a Muslim family from Albania and raised in the faith before leaving it in his teens, becoming an atheist. His work is about salafism, wahabism, and the renouncing of faith.

His first graphic novel, Table for One, was nominated for a Russ Manning Most Promising Newcomer award in 2004 and an Eisner award - Talent Deserving of Wider Recognition in 2005. He is currently producing The Infidel, featuring Pigman, a self-described "counter-jihad superhero". In 2015, he won a controversial contest advertised as the "First Annual Muhammad Art Exhibit and Contest" which saw the Curtis Culwell Center attack take place.

References

 

Year of birth missing (living people)
Living people
American former Muslims
American cartoonists
American people of Albanian descent
American critics of Islam
American atheists
21st-century atheists
Counter-jihad activists
Former Muslims turned agnostics or atheists
Former Muslim critics of Islam
Objectivists
American male artists
American graphic novelists